Alteriqipengyuania halimionae is a  Gram-negative, rod-shaped and motile bacterium from the genus Alteriqipengyuania which has been isolated from the plant Halimione portulacoides.

References 

Sphingomonadales
Bacteria described in 2017